Mi Mi Khaing (1916 – 15 March 1990) was a Burmese scholar and writer who authored numerous books and articles on life in Burma during the 20th century. She is notable as one of the first women to write in English about Burmese culture and traditions.

Life
Born of Mon ancestry, Mi Mi Khaing grew up during the British colonial rule of Burma and was educated in British schools. She attended St. John's Convent School, and gained first a BA (Hons) from Rangoon University and then a BSc from King's College London.<ref name=DWW>'Daw Mi Mi Khaing (1916–1990)', in Anne Commire, ed., Dictionary of Women Worldwide. Republished at encyclopedia.com. Accessed 11 February 2020.</ref> She married Sao Saimong, a noted scholar and a member of the royal family of Kengtung State, one of the Shan States. In addition to her writing career, she also established Kambawza College in Taunggyi and served as its principal. In later life she lost her sight as the result of a brain tumour, but learnt to read and write in Braille.

The geologist Yin Yin Nwe is her daughter.

Published works
BooksBurmese Family (1946, 1962), Bloomington, IN, Indiana University Press, 1962.Cook and Entertain the Burmese Way (1978), Karoma Publishers, 1978.The World of Burmese Women'' (1984), London, Zed Press, 1984.

Articles
 (with Charles S. Brant)

References

Sources
Maxim, Sarah (1987). The World of Burmese Women. The Journal of Asian Studies, Vol. 46, No. 3 (Aug., 1987), pp. 699–700.
Clague, John (1948). Burmese Family: Review. International Affairs, Vol. 24, No. 2 (Apr., 1948), p. 298.

1916 births
1990 deaths
Burmese people of Mon descent
Burmese scholars
People from Bago Region
University of Yangon alumni
Kengtung State
20th-century Burmese women writers
20th-century Burmese writers
Blind writers
Blind academics
English-language writers from Myanmar